Magdolna Bartha (20 December 1929 – 14 October 2004) was a Hungarian cross-country skier. She competed in the women's 10 kilometres at the 1960 Winter Olympics, at Squaw Valley in California, finishing in 23rd place.

References

External links
 

1929 births
2004 deaths
Hungarian female cross-country skiers
Olympic cross-country skiers of Hungary
Cross-country skiers at the 1960 Winter Olympics
Skiers from Budapest